The 1974 Pacific Southwest Open was a men's tennis tournament played on outdoor hard courts at the Los Angeles Tennis Center in Los Angeles, California in the United States. The event was categorized as an AA Group tournament and was part of the 1974 Grand Prix tennis circuit. It was the 48th edition of the tournament and ran from September 17 through September 23, 1974. First-seeded and defending champion Jimmy Connors won the singles title after having survived two matchpoints in his first round match against Mal Anderson. With his victory Connors earned $16,000 first prize money as well as 80 Grand Prix ranking points.

Finals

Singles
 Jimmy Connors defeated  Harold Solomon 6–3, 6–1
 It was Connors' 13th singles title of the year and the 30th of his career.

Doubles
 Ross Case /  Geoff Masters defeated  Brian Gottfried /  Raúl Ramírez 6–3, 6–2

References

External links
 ITF tournament edition details

Los Angeles Open (tennis)
Pacific Southwest Open
Pacific Southwest Open
Pacific Southwest Open
Pacific Southwest Open